Thomas William Ludlow "Lud" Ashley (January 11, 1923 – June 15, 2010) was an American businessman and politician of the Democratic Party. He served as a U.S. representative from Ohio from 1955 to 1981.

Early life and education
Ashley was born on January 11, 1923, in Toledo, Ohio, and raised on the Old West End. He was the son of Mary Alida Gouverneur (née Ludlow) Ashley and William Meredith Ashley, who owned a small steel manufacturing firm. His older brother William was killed in May 1944, at age 22, when his Army bomber exploded during a training mission over Massachusetts.

Ashley attended Maumee Valley Country Day School and graduated from the Kent School in Connecticut in 1942. During World War II, he served in the United States Army as a corporal in the Pacific Theater of Operations. After the war, Ashley attended Yale University, where he graduated in 1948. At Yale, he was a member of the secret society Skull and Bones along with future U.S. President George H. W. Bush.

After graduating from Yale, Ashley worked with the Toledo Publicity and Efficiency Commission. Encouraged by Michael DiSalle, then mayor of Toledo and later governor of Ohio, he began studying law through night classes at the University of Toledo College of Law. He graduated from Ohio State University College of Law in 1951. He was admitted to the bar that year and began practicing law.

Career 
Ashley joined the staff of Radio Free Europe (RFE) in 1952. He served in Europe for RFE as the co-director of the press section and later the assistant director of special projects. He resigned from RFE on March 1, 1954, to run for Congress.

U.S. Congress
Ashley was elected to Congress in 1954, beating the incumbent Frazier Reams, an independent, by 4,000 votes in a three-way race. He served 13 terms in Congress and was chairman of the Select Committee on Energy (Ad Hoc) from 1977 to 1979 and of the United States House Committee on Merchant Marine and Fisheries from 1979 to 1981.

In 1961, Ashley was one of six congressmen who voted to withdraw funding for the House Un-American Activities Committee. He helped pass the 1964 Civil Rights Act and was a proponent of anti-poverty and housing legislation.

In 1980, Ashley lost in an upset to Republican challenger Ed Weber.

Later career
Ashley was a member of the George H.W. Bush Presidential Library and Museum board and served on many corporate boards, including Fannie Mae and Freddie Mac, the country's two largest mortgage lenders.

Personal life
Ashley was twice married. He married Margaret Mary Sherman in 1956 but they separated shortly thereafter. He married Kathleen Lucey in 1967 at the Cathedral of St. Mary of the Assumption in Trenton, New Jersey. Kathleen, the daughter of Charley Lucey (editor of The Times Newspapers in Trenton), was a graduate of Trinity College and Georgetown Law School and the Washington editor for the United States Savings and Loan League. They had three children:

 Lise Ashley, who married Steven Francis Xavier Murphy, a son of Major General Dennis J. Murphy.
 William Meredith Ashley, who married Monica Ann Manginello in 2008.
 Mark Michael Ashley

Kathleen Ashley died of heart failure at George Washington University Hospital in 1997. Lud Ashley lived in Leland, Michigan, until his death from melanoma at his home on June 15, 2010. After his death, George H. W. Bush said in a statement that he and Barbara Bush "mourn the loss of a very close friend" and said Ashley "might well have been my very best friend in life."

References

External links

1923 births
2010 deaths
United States Army soldiers
United States Army personnel of World War II
Yale University alumni
Ohio State University Moritz College of Law alumni
University of Toledo alumni
Democratic Party members of the United States House of Representatives from Ohio
Kent School alumni
Politicians from Toledo, Ohio
People from Leland, Michigan
20th-century American politicians
Maumee Valley Country Day School alumni
Military personnel from Ohio